Subkey can refer to:
 A hard-coded parameter in a key schedule
 A key in OpenPGP that is bound by a master key

See also
 Key (disambiguation)
 Key (cryptography)